The 2012 Orbetello Challenger was a professional tennis tournament played on clay courts. It was the fourth edition of the tournament which was part of the 2012 ATP Challenger Tour. It took place in Orbetello, Italy between 23 and 29 July 2012.

Singles main draw entrants

Seeds

 1 Rankings are as of July 16, 2012.

Other entrants
The following players received wildcards into the singles main draw:
  Marco Cecchinato
  Alessio di Mauro
  Matteo Marrai
  Walter Trusendi

The following players received entry as a special exempt into the singles main draw:
  Evgeny Korolev

The following players received entry from the qualifying draw:
  Theodoros Angelinos
  Jérôme Inzerillo
  Dušan Lajović
  Goran Tošić

Champions

Singles

 Roberto Bautista Agut def.  Dušan Lajović, 6–3, 6–1

Doubles

 Stefano Ianni /  Dane Propoggia def.  Alessio di Mauro /  Simone Vagnozzi, 6–3, 6–2

External links
Official website

Orbetello Challenger
Orbetello Challenger